Towerby is a suburb of Johannesburg, South Africa. This small suburb is tucked between Forest Hill and Rosettenville. It is located in Region F of the City of Johannesburg Metropolitan Municipality.

History
Prior to the discovery of gold on the Witwatersrand in 1886, the suburb lay on land on one of the original farms called Turffontein. It became a suburb on 18 March 1953 taking its name from a nearby water tower.

References

Johannesburg Region F